Back Fire is a 1922 American silent Western film directed by Alan James and starring Jack Hoxie, Florence Gilbert, and Lew Meehan.

Plot
"Lightning" Carson and a chance acquaintance, Jim Hampton, drift into a little town in the West. Desperately in need of money, Jim suggests that they hold up the Wells-Fargo office. The suggestion is overheard.  By chance, the express office is robbed and the two are suspected.  Hampton is thrown into jail and "Lightning" pursued by the Sheriff.  He meets Jim's sister and falls in love with her.  When the Sheriff finally traps "Lightning" it is found he is a Texas Ranger.  They join forces and the battle follows between them and the real outlaws.  When the bandits are captured "Lightning" claims Jim's sister, Betty.

-- Motion Picture News Booking Guide

Cast

References

External links
 

1922 films
1922 Western (genre) films
American black-and-white films
Films directed by Alan James
Silent American Western (genre) films
1920s English-language films
1920s American films